is a Japanese composer and pianist known for his soundtracks for many animations.

He also works on various artists like Ogawa Mishio, Yumeno Kabu, Umezu Kazutoki, Ohtaka Sizzle, Watanabe Takao and many more.

Biography 
Yoshimori Makoto was born in Hiroshima, Japan. He started his musical career in 1986 participating as a keyboardist in a variety of concerts around the Kansai region. In 1991 he graduated from the music program at the Osaka Kyoiku University and then moved to Tokyo in 1992, at first, as a member of Modern Choki Chokies. From 1995 through 1998, being a multi-keyboardist, he played the piano, synthesizer, and accordion at various night clubs around Tokyo for bands such as Hikashu. He also played the piano and accordion for various musicals such as Big in 1998. He joined the keyboard harmonica orchestra P-blot in 1996 and was considered "the most avant-garde man" of the group because of his acute and clear playing. Through his various activities in Tokyo he dealt with many genres of music and learned different aspects of composition, arrangement, and music production. In recent years he has mainly worked as a composer of soundtracks for anime, often collaborating with director Takahiro Omori.

Yoshimori Makoto has released his 1st piano solo CD "Uta no Soba ni: A Song is on Your Side." in 2010, 2nd CD "Oto no Aware" in 2013, 3rd CD "Everyday Evening" in 2020 via his own Apollo Black Records (All solo albums are only available on CD format, unavailable on any streaming services). At the same time of releasing 3rd CD, he launched the completely brand-new Official Website and announced his previous site would close soon.

Discography

Original albums

TV works

Anime works

Other works

References

External links
 Yoshimori Makoto Official Website (launched in 2020)
 Buy his latest solo CD "Everyday Evening" exclusively at "musique69 Archive Recordings"
Discography at VGMdb
 
 

1969 births
20th-century Japanese composers
20th-century Japanese male musicians
20th-century Japanese pianists
21st-century Japanese composers
21st-century Japanese male musicians
21st-century Japanese pianists
Anime composers
Japanese film score composers
Japanese male film score composers
Japanese male pianists
Japanese music arrangers
Japanese pianists
Living people
Musicians from Hiroshima Prefecture